Ghayl Ba Wazir (or Gjail Ba Wazir) is a city in eastern Yemen. It is located in the Hadhramaut Governorate.

Economy

As of 1920, Ghayl Ba Wazir was producing tobacco. The tobacco, called humuni, is brown and coarse and has been described as having a "flavour very strong."

References

External links
Ghayl Ba Wazir

Populated places in Hadhramaut Governorate